The 2022 Christchurch local elections were held via postal voting between September and October 2022 as part of the wider 2022 New Zealand local elections. Elections in Christchurch covered one territorial authority, the Christchurch City Council, and six community boards.

Christchurch City Council
Each ward of the Christchurch City Council returned one councillor to the city council. The first-past-the-post system was used to elect the Mayor of Christchurch and city councillors for the 2022–2025 term. Voter turnout was 43.31%. The positions of mayor and sixteen city councillors were contested by the following candidates:

Mayor

Incumbent three-term mayor Lianne Dalziel chose not to stand for a fourth term. Phil Mauger, first elected as a city councillor at the 2019 local elections, was elected to succeed her as mayor.

Councillors
Incumbent candidate

Harewood Ward

Waimairi Ward

Papanui Ward

Fendalton Ward

Innes Ward

Burwood Ward

Coastal Ward

Hornby Ward

Halswell Ward

Riccarton Ward

Spreydon Ward

Central Ward

Cashmere Ward

Linwood Ward

Heathcote Ward

Banks Peninsula Ward

Other local elections
Depending on where in Christchurch they lived, voters also voted in concurrent local elections for the:
Environment Canterbury (Canterbury Regional Council):
Christchurch North / Ōrei constituency;
Christchurch West / Ōpuna constituency;
Christchurch Central / Ōhoko constituency; or
Christchurch South / Ōwhanga constituency; and
Waimāero Fendalton-Waimairi-Harewood Community Board;
Waipapa Papanui-Innes-Central Community Board;
Waitai Coastal-Burwood-Linwood Community Board;
Waihoro Spreydon-Cashmere-Heathcote Community Board;
Waipuna Halswell-Hornby-Riccarton Community Board; or
Te Pātaka o Rākaihautū Banks Peninsula Community Board.

References

Politics of Christchurch
Christchurch
Christchurch
2020s in Christchurch
Christchurch